Blaha or Bláha (feminine: Bláhová) is a Czech and Slovak surname. Notable people with the surname include:

 Constantin Blaha, Austrian diver
 Dagmar Bláhová (born 1949), Czech television actress
 František Bláha, Czech sport shooter
 George Blaha (born 1945), the radio and TV play-by-play voice of the Detroit Pistons since the 1976–77 NBA season
 Gustav Blaha, Austrian footballer
 Inocenc Arnošt Bláha (1879–1960), prominent Czech sociologist and philosopher
 Jana Blahová (born 1984), Czech sprint canoeist
 Jan Blaha, Czech Roman Catholic bishop
 John E. Blaha (born 1942), engineer, retired United States Air Force Colonel and a former NASA astronaut
 Joseph C. Blaha (1877–1944), American businessman and politician
 Julie Blaha, 19th State Auditor of Minnesota
 Klára Bláhová, Czech tennis player
 Lubomír Blaha (born 1978), Czech professional football player
 Lujza Blaha (1850–1926), Hungarian actress and singer
 Martin Bláha (born 1977), Czech cyclist
 Martin Blaha (footballer) (born 1985), Czech football goalkeeper

See also 
 22442 Blaha, main-belt asteroid
 Blahová, village in Slovakia

Czech-language surnames
Slovak-language surnames